Kelk is a civil parish in the East Riding of Yorkshire, England.

The civil parish is formed by the village of Great Kelk and the hamlet of Little Kelk.

According to the 2011 UK census, Kelk parish had a population of 158, a decrease on the 2001 UK census figure of 180.

References

Civil parishes in the East Riding of Yorkshire